Kenny Dennard (October 18, 1958) is a retired American professional basketball player who competed in the National Basketball Association (NBA) for three seasons. He played college basketball at Duke University, helping the Blue Devils to the 1978 NCAA championship game where the Blue Devils lost to Kentucky, and in the NBA played for the Kansas City Kings and Denver Nuggets. Dennard started his career in the Continental Basketball Association (CBA), where he averaged 10.4 points and 10.1 rebounds in 35 games for the Montana Golden Nuggets in the 1981–82 season. Dennard's NBA career was cut short by testicular cancer.

References

1958 births
Living people
American men's basketball players
Basketball players from North Carolina
Denver Nuggets players
Duke Blue Devils men's basketball players
Kansas City Kings draft picks
Kansas City Kings players
Montana Golden Nuggets players
Power forwards (basketball)